Roald Aga Haug (born 26 July 1972) is a Norwegian politician for the Labour Party.

He served as a deputy representative to the Parliament of Norway from Hordaland during the terms 2009–2013 and 2013–2017. He hails from Odda.

References

1972 births
Living people
People from Odda
Deputy members of the Storting
Labour Party (Norway) politicians
Hordaland politicians
21st-century Norwegian politicians